Libellulium is an extinct genus of dragonfly from the Jurassic period known from fossil finds in Europe.

References

Jurassic insects of Europe
Fossil taxa described in 1854